Irina Rayevskaya (born 18 September 1984) is a Russian swimmer. She competed at the 2000 Summer Olympics in the 100 m and 200 m backstroke and finished in 29th and 19th place, respectively.

References

External links
Irina RAYEVSKAYA. les-sports.info
Irina Raevskaya (RUS). i-swimmer.ru

1984 births
Living people
Olympic swimmers of Russia
Swimmers at the 2000 Summer Olympics
Russian female backstroke swimmers